Adele Price (born 14 July 1935) is a former Australian diver. She competed in the 1956 Melbourne Olympic Games.

At the 1956 Melbourne Olympics, Price finished 18th in the 10m platform.

Personal 
Price's married name is Johnson.

References

External links
 
 
 

1935 births
Living people
Olympic divers of Australia
Divers at the 1956 Summer Olympics
Australian female divers